Dragoslav Mihailović (Serbian Cyrillic: Драгослав Михаиловић; 17 November 1930 – 12 March 2023) was a Serbian writer.

sq:Dragoslav Mihailović

Life
Mihailović graduated in Yugoslav literature from the University of Belgrade in 1957 and was a member of the Serbian Academy of Sciences and Arts since 1981. In 1950 he was arrested and then imprisoned 15 months at Goli otok.

Mihailović lived in Belgrade. He died on 12 March 2023, at the age of 92.

Works
1967 – Frede, laku noć (Фреде, лаку ноћ); Matica srpska, Novi Sad
1968 – Kad su cvetale tikve (Кад су цветале тикве); Matica srpska, Novi Sad
1975 – Petrijin venac (Петријин венац); Srpska književna zadruga, Belgrade
1983 – Čizmaši (Чизмаши); Srpska književna zadruga, Belgrade
1990 – Goli otok (Голи оток); NIP Politika, Belgrade
1993 – Lov na stenice (Лов на стенице); Beogradski izdavačko-grafički zavod, Belgrade
1994 – Gori Morava (Гори Морава); Srpska književna zadruga, Belgrade
2001 – Crveno i plavo (Црвено и плаво); NIN, Belgrade
2006 – Vreme za povratak (Време за повратак)
2010 – Preživljavanje (Преживљавање); Zavod za udžbenike, Belgrade
2019 – Treće proleće (Треће пролеће); Laguna, Belgrade

References

External links
 Serbian Academy of Sciences and Arts biography 

1930 births
2023 deaths
People from Ćuprija
Serbian writers
University of Belgrade alumni
Members of the Serbian Academy of Sciences and Arts
Golden Arena winners
Yugoslav dissidents
Prisoners and detainees of Yugoslavia